This is a list of notable recorded floods that have occurred in the country of Australia.

References

Further reading
 Devin, L.B. and D.L. Purcell (1983) Flooding in Australia Canberra : Australian Government Publishing Service  : (Water 2000 : consultants report no. 11)(Department of Resources and Energy).

External links

 Flood and natural hazard research from Bushfire and Natural Hazards CRC
  Geosciences Australia overview fact sheets.
  South Australian flood history .